The 2004 America East men's basketball tournament was hosted by the Boston University Terriers at Walter Brown Arena. The final was held at Patrick Gym on the campus of the University of Vermont, and was the first basketball game held in the state of Vermont to be nationally televised, airing on ESPN. Vermont gained its second consecutive conference tournament win and NCAA tournament berth with its win over Maine. Vermont was given the 15th seed in the West Regional of the NCAA Tournament and lost in the first round to Connecticut 70–53. Boston University gained a bid to the NIT and lost in the opening round to Rhode Island 80–52.

Bracket and Results

* Game Ended in Overtime

See also
America East Conference

References

Sources

America East Conference men's basketball tournament
2003–04 America East Conference men's basketball season
2004 in sports in Vermont
Sports competitions in Burlington, Vermont
College basketball tournaments in Vermont